Daniel Crisostomo (born January 16, 1997) is an American soccer player who plays as a midfielder for Major League Soccer club Los Angeles FC.

Playing career

College and amateur
Raised in Fontana, California, Crisostomo played four years of college soccer at University of California, Irvine between 2015 and 2018.

While at college, Crisostomo also appeared for USL Premier Development League side FC Golden State Force in 2016, and National Premier Soccer League side Orange County FC in 2017.

Professional
On March 1, 2019, Crisostomo signed with USL Championship side Orange County SC.

On April 5, 2021, Crisostomo joined Las Vegas Lights ahead of the 2021 season.

On August 4, 2021, Crisostomo joined Los Angeles FC for the 2021 season with the option to extend to 2024. Crisostomo was released by Los Angeles following the 2021 season.

On February 4, 2022, Crisostomo re-signed with Las Vegas Lights ahead of their 2022 season.

On May 21, 2022, Crisostomo returned to Los Angeles FC on a 4-day loan.

On January 26, 2023, Crisostomo returned once again to Los Angeles FC, this time signing a one-year contract along with former Las Vegas Lights teammate Abraham Romero.

References 

1997 births
Living people
American soccer players
Association football midfielders
FC Golden State Force players
Las Vegas Lights FC players
Los Angeles FC players
Orange County SC players
People from Fontana, California
Soccer players from California
Sportspeople from San Bernardino County, California
UC Irvine Anteaters men's soccer players
USL Championship players
USL League Two players
National Premier Soccer League players